The Venerable Alexander Cory  was Archdeacon of the Isle of Wight.

Born into an ecclesiastical family on 19 March 1890, he was educated at St John's School, Leatherhead, Keble College, Oxford and Ripon College Cuddesdon he was ordained in 1914. After a curacy at Portsea he was a World War I temporary Chaplain to the Forces.  He was Rector of Burton Overy from 1919 to 1923 and then Vicar of St Mary's, Far Cotton until 1928. After that he was Vicar of Fareham for a decade then the incumbent at Hayling Island until 1946. Moving to the Isle of Wight he was Vicar of All Saints, Ryde from 1946 to 1952 when he became Archdeacon of the whole island

He died on 7 April 1973

Notes

1890 births
People educated at St John's School, Leatherhead
Alumni of Keble College, Oxford
Alumni of Ripon College Cuddesdon
Archdeacons of the Isle of Wight
1973 deaths
World War I chaplains
Royal Army Chaplains' Department officers